EOS CCA, headquartered in Norwell, Massachusetts (just outside Boston), is a provider of customer care and receivables management services. It is the U.S. Receivables Management Division of the international EOS Group based in Hamburg, Germany. As of December, 2016 EOS CCA employs approximately 500 people in the United States. As of December 2016, EOS CCA received a rating of ‘A+’ from the Better Business Bureau.
On December 16, 2021 EOS USA/Canada was purchased by Transworld Systems Inc aka TSI.
https://tsico.com/transworld-systems-inc-completes-acquisition-of-eos-north-america/

EOS CCA provides first-party customer care and early intervention; first- and third-party pre-collect and early stage receivables management; third party receivables management – primary, secondary, tertiary, and warehousing; and portfolio purchases. In addition to debt recovery and collection services, EOS CCA provides account and data scrubbing; credit bureau reporting; scoring services, including scores and score migration; skip tracing services; dialer services; and other financial services including analytics, attributes, and triggers.

EOS CCA was originally founded as Collection Company of America in 1991 and has specialized in receivables collection since then.

From the early days when EOS CCA provided basic collection services, the company has developed into a premier agency for all stages of receivables management.

In 2001, EOS CCA became the U.S. arm of the EOS Group, a worldwide accounts receivables collection and financial services provider. CCA was renamed EOS CCA in 2009.

It is the goal of EOS CCA to work with consumers with the utmost respect and professionalism to resolve their outstanding debt issues.

History 
Paul E. Leary Sr. founded Collecto, Inc. d/b/a Collection Company of America in 1991.
In 2006, Collecto, Inc. started doing business as CCA.
In 2001, CCA joined the EOS Group of Hamburg, Germany. 
On October 5, 2009, Collecto, Inc., d/b/a CCA, and its six affiliated companies changed their d/b/a to EOS CCA.
EOS USA is one of America's largest customer care and receivables management. For more than 20 years, EOS USA has been a national leader in providing these services to a variety of industries including healthcare, higher education, communications, government, financial services and utilities. EOS USA is a division of the EOS Group, one of Europe's largest ARO organizations with over 60 subsidiaries, 7,500 employees and an operational presence in 26 countries. EOS USA comprises EOS USA, EOS Healthcare and EOS CCA. Headquartered in Norwell, Massachusetts, EOS USA has four additional regional offices in California, Illinois, Kentucky and Texas.

Leadership 
EOS CCA was founded as Collecto, Inc. d/b/a Collection Company of America by Paul E. Leary Sr. in 1991. The company grew from a one-person operation in 1991 to one of the United States' 20 largest AROs. Leary Sr. stepped down as CEO in 2002 and is now a member of the EOS Group's International Board of Directors.
Mr. Ben Ribeiro, VP of Consumer Relations. Tod Dillon, Chief Executive Officer. Candice O'Brien, Chief Operating Officer. Rick Gilbertson, Vice President of Information Technology. Karen Player, Vice President of Human Resources

Locations 
EOS CCA is headquartered just outside Boston at 700 Longwater Dr Norwell, Massachusetts 02061 with regional centers across the United States.

EOS USA has four additional regional offices in California, Illinois, Kentucky and Texas.

References 

11. https://tsico.com/transworld-systems-inc-completes-acquisition-of-eos-north-america/

External links 
 EOS CCA website
 The EOS Group website

Debt collection

 TSI website